Mukesh Singh Gahlot (born 1 May 1978) is an Indian bodybuilder and powerlifter.
He holds the national record of winning Mr. India title 4 times, in 2008, 2009, 2010, and 2012.

Achievements
 British Open Powerlifting Championship 2012 - Two gold medals 
 World Powerlifting Championship 2013 - Gold
 Asian Bodybuilding Championship, 2012 - Silver medal
 Olympia, 2018 Pro Powerlifting Division- Bronze Medal
 Olympia, 2017 Pro Powerlifting Division- Gold Medal
 Mr. India 2008, 2009, 2010, 2012
World Powerlifting Championship England 2016 - Gold Medal

References

External links
Mukesh Singh Inerview

Indian bodybuilders
Living people
1978 births